Greynolds Park is a  urban park in metropolitan Miami, just north of North Miami Beach, Florida, United States.

History
In 1933 A. O. Greynolds donated the tract of land, originally used as a limestone quarry, to Dade County. The park was developed between 1936 and 1939 by the Civilian Conservation Corps as a part of the New Deal public works program.

In 1979, the Youth Conservation Corp constructed the Oleta River Nature Trail and wooden footbridge on the shallows of the Oleta River through the mangroves.

Facilities
The park offers various amenities, including picnic and recreation areas, a golf course, a bird rookery, a boathouse, and a  mound, the highest point  in South Florida.

The boathouse features a nature exhibit and offers interpretive programs including guided (or unguided) nature walks, lectures, campfires and more.  Kayak, canoe and paddleboat rentals are available on weekends and holidays.
 
In the early 1990’s the resident alligators were removed from Greynolds Park. These were the “protectors” of the bird rookery. Within 2 years of their removal the bird rookery no longer existed. The birds did not want their nests raided by the park’s raccoons and moved to other locations during nesting season. They have not returned to the park ever since.

References

Parks in Miami-Dade County, Florida
Civilian Conservation Corps in Florida
Nature centers in Florida
Protected areas established in 1933
1933 establishments in Florida